The 2016 Busan Open was a professional tennis tournament played on hard courts. It was the fifteenth edition of the tournament which was part of the 2016 ATP Challenger Tour. It took place in Busan, South Korea between 2 and 8 May 2016.

Singles main-draw entrants

Seeds
* 1 Rankings as of April 25, 2016.

Other entrants
The following players received wildcards into the singles main draw:
  Oh Chan-yeong
  Kwon Soon-woo
  Hong Seong-chan
  Nam Ji-sung

The following player were given special exempt to gain entry into the singles main draw:
  Liam Broady

The following player entered as alternate:
  Daniel Nguyen

The following players received entry from the qualifying draw:
  Matthew Barton
  Jimmy Wang
  Michał Przysiężny
  Marinko Matosevic

Champions

Singles

 Konstantin Kravchuk def.  Daniel Evans, 6–4, 6–4

Doubles

 Sam Groth /  Leander Paes def.  Sanchai Ratiwatana /  Sonchat Ratiwatana, 4–6, 6–1, [10–7]

External links
Official Website

Busan Open
Busan Open
May 2016 sports events in South Korea
Busan